Julien Gunn (July 1, 1877 – February 1, 1948) was an American lawyer and Democratic politician who served as a member of the Virginia Senate and Virginia House of Delegates. In 1920, he was appointed by President Woodrow Wilson to be United States Attorney for the Eastern District of Virginia.

References

External links
 
 

1877 births
1948 deaths
United States Attorneys for the Eastern District of Virginia
University of Richmond alumni
University of Virginia alumni
Democratic Party Virginia state senators
20th-century American politicians
20th-century American lawyers
People from Cumberland County, Virginia